Serov is a Russian masculine surname, its feminine counterpart is Serova. Notable people with the surname include:

Aleksander Serov (born 1954), Ukrainian-born Russian popular singer
Alexander Serov (1820–1871), Russian composer and music critic
Alexander Serov (cyclist) (born 1982), Russian road and track racing cyclist
Anna Lidia Vega Serova (born 1968), Cuban writer
Daria Serova (born 1982), Russian freestyle skier 
Irina Serova (born 1966), Austrian-Soviet badminton player 
Ivan Serov (1905–1990), head of the KGB in 1954–1958 and of the GRU in 1958–1963
Marina Serova (born 1966), Soviet figure skater 
Roman Serov (b. 1976), Russian-born figure skater competing for Israel
Valentin Serov (1865–1911), Russian painter
Valentina Serova (1917–1975), Soviet film and theatre actress
Valentina Serova (composer)  (1846–1924), Russian composer 
Vladimir Serov (footballer) (born 1979), Russian football player
Vladimir Serov (pilot) (1922–1944), Soviet flying ace
Yelena Serova (born 1976), Russian cosmonaut

See also
Serov (town), a town in Sverdlovsk Oblast, Russia
Serow, six species of medium-sized goat- or antelope-like mammals in the genus Capricornis

Russian-language surnames